Tazeyevo (Täjäy) is a rural locality (a selo) and the administrative centre of Kuzhbakhtinsky Selsoviet, Ilishevsky District, Bashkortostan, Russia. The population was 518 as of 2010. There are 7 streets.

Geography 
Tazeyevo is located 32 km northeast of Verkhneyarkeyevo (the district's administrative centre) by road. Kuzhbakhty is the nearest rural locality.

References 

Rural localities in Ilishevsky District